Letters  is a village on the south west shore of Loch Broom,  in Garve, Ross-shire,  Scottish Highlands and is in the Scottish council area of Highland.

References

Populated places in Ross and Cromarty